The Malaysian Agricultural Research and Development Institute Act 1969, is a Malaysian laws which enacted to establish the Malaysian Agricultural Research and Development Institute and for matters connected with it.

Structure
The Malaysian Agricultural Research and Development Institute Act 1969, in its current form (1 January 2006), consists of 6 Parts containing 25 sections and 1 schedule (including 11 amendments).
 Part I: Preliminary
 Part II: The Institute
 Part III: The Board
 Part IV: The Scientific Council
 Part V: The Fund and Accounts
 Part VI: Supplemental
 Schedule

References

External links
 Malaysian Agricultural Research and Development Institute Act 1969 

1969 in Malaysian law
Malaysian federal legislation